Italy competed at the 2012 Summer Paralympics in London, United Kingdom, from 29 August to 9 September 2012.

Medalists

| width="70%" align="left" valign="top" |

| width="30%" align="left" valign="top" |

Archery

Men

|-
|align=left|Giampaolo Cancelli
|align=left rowspan="2"|Ind. compound open
|630
|21
| (12)W 6–0
| (5)L 2–6
|colspan="4"|Did not advance
|-
|align=left|Alberto Simoncelli
|659
|5
| (28)W 6–4
| (21)W 6–2
| (13)L 4–6
|colspan="3"|Did not advance
|-
|align=left|Fabio Azzolini
|align=left rowspan="2"|Ind. compound W1
|612
|8
| 
| (9)W 6–5
| (1)L 5–6
|colspan="3"|Did not advance
|-
|align=left|Gabriele Ferrandi
|590
|9
| 
| (8)L 5–6
| colspan="4"|Did not advance
|-
|align=left|Vittorio Bartoli
|align=left rowspan="2"|Ind. recurve W1/W2
|579
|15
| (18)L 2–6
|colspan="5"|Did not advance
|-
|align=left|Oscar De Pellegrin
|625
|4
|  
| (20)W 6–0
| (5)W 6–4
| (1)W 7–3
|W 6–5
|
|-
|align=left|Mario Esposito
|align=left|Ind. recurve standing
|574
|22
| (11)L 2–6
|colspan="5"|Did not advance
|-
|align=left|Vittorio BartoliOscar De PellegrinMario Esposito
|align=left|Men's team recurve
|1778
|6
|
|
| (3)L 185–194
|colspan=3|Did not advance
|}

Women

|-
|align=left|Veronica Floreno
|align=left rowspan="3"|Ind. recurve W1/W2
|517
|12
| 
| (5)W 6–2
| (13)W 6–2
| (1)L 0–6
| (11)L 4–6
|4
|-
|align=left|Elisabetta Mijno
|588
|2
| 
| (15)W 7–3
| (7)W 6–2
| (11)W 6–4
| (1)L 3–7
|
|-
|align=left|Mariangela Perna
|480
|16
| (17)W 6–0
| (1)L 0–6
|colspan="4"|Did not advance
|-
|align=left|Veronica FlorenoElisabetta MijnoMariangela Perna
|align=left|Women's team recurve
|1585
|4
|colspan="2" 
| (5)W 183–175
| (1)L 187–192
| (2)L 184–188
|4
|}

Athletics

Men's track

Women's track

Women's field

Cycling

Track

Road – road race

Road – time trial

Equestrian

Individual

Team

* Indicates that score counts in team total

Rowing

Qualification Legend: FA=Final A (medal); FB=Final B (non-medal); R=Repechage

Sailing

* Due to a lack of wind Race 11 was cancelled

Shooting

Swimming

Men

Qualifiers for the latter rounds (Q) of all events were decided on a time only basis, therefore positions shown are overall results versus competitors in all heats.

Women

Qualifiers for the latter rounds (Q) of all events were decided on a time only basis, therefore positions shown are overall results versus competitors in all heats.

Table tennis

Men's singles

Women's singles

Teams

Wheelchair basketball

Italy qualified for the men's team event in wheelchair basketball by finishing fourth at the 2010 Wheelchair Basketball World Championship. Competing athletes are given an eight-level-score specific to wheelchair basketball, ranging from 0.5 to 4.5 with lower scores representing a higher degree of disability. The sum score of all players on the court cannot exceed 14.

Group play

9th–10th place match

Wheelchair fencing

Wheelchair tennis

See also
Italy at the Paralympics
Italy at the 2012 Summer Olympics

References

Nations at the 2012 Summer Paralympics
2012
Paralympics